Home is an unincorporated village located in Rayne Township, Indiana County, Pennsylvania, United States. Home has the ZIP code 15747 and is located in telephone area code 724.

History
The community received its name because its first post office was located in the "home" of postmaster Hugh Cannon in 1834, though people often referred to it by its original name, Kellysburg.

The author Edward Abbey moved to Home in 1931, having been born in the Indiana hospital and spending the first four-and-a-half years in other towns and villages in the area. Abbey, known for his depictions of nature and its beauty, was said to have gotten much of his inspiration from growing up in Home.

See also
 Home (The X-Files), an episode of The X-files set in Home

References

Unincorporated communities in Pennsylvania
Populated places established in 1834
Unincorporated communities in Indiana County, Pennsylvania
1834 establishments in Pennsylvania